Baldwin Bazuaye (born 9 September 1964,Benin City) is a retired Nigerian international footballer, who played as a forward. He hails from Edo State. He was once a Bendel United F.C. coach and he resigned.

Club career
Born in Nigeria, Bazuaye moved to play in the Greek second division at the age of 24, signing with Ethnikos Piraeus F.C.

Bazuaye would finish his playing career in Nigeria, playing for Concord F.C. and Shooting Stars F.C., helping the latter in their 1999 CAF Champions League campaign.

Football career
Bazuaye was a member of Nigeria's squad which won the 1985 FIFA U-16 World Championship. He would also play for the senior Nigeria national football team and participated in the 1990 African Nations Cup finals. he later became a coach in Bendel Insurance F.C. and resigned.

Managerial career
After his playing career ended, Bazuaye began coaching and took the helm of Lobi Stars F.C.

References

External links

1968 births
Living people
Nigerian footballers
Nigeria international footballers
Nigeria youth international footballers
1990 African Cup of Nations players
Ethnikos Piraeus F.C. players
Shooting Stars S.C. players
Nigerian expatriate footballers
Expatriate footballers in Greece
Association football forwards
Sportspeople from Benin City